Cheonan Oryong Stadium (Oryong Civic Stadium) was a multi-use stadium in Cheonan, South Korea. It was used mostly for football matches. The stadium had a capacity of 21,000 people and opened in 1983. The stadium was demolished in 2009.

Other Stadia in Cheonan
Cheonan Baekseok Stadium is located about N ~500m, W ~3.0 km from Cheonan Yeok (Station).

References
제 4탄 천안 오룡 경기장 ①  - Dream stadium of K-League  
제 4탄 천안 오룡 경기장 ②  - Dream stadium of K-League

External links
 Cheonan Sports Facilities Management Center 
 World Stadiums

Defunct football venues in South Korea
Sport in South Chungcheong Province
Buildings and structures in Cheonan
Multi-purpose stadiums in South Korea
Sports venues completed in 1983
Sports venues demolished in 2009
Demolished buildings and structures in South Korea
1983 establishments in South Korea
2009 disestablishments in South Korea
20th-century architecture in South Korea